These are lists of countries by foreign-born population (immigrants) and lists of countries by number native-born persons living in a foreign country (emigrants).

According to the United Nations, in 2019, the United States, Germany, and Saudi Arabia had the largest number of immigrants of any country, while Tuvalu, Saint Helena, and Tokelau had the lowest. In terms of percentage of population, the Vatican City, the United Arab Emirates, and Qatar had the highest, while Cuba, Madagascar, and China had the lowest.

According to estimates from the same UN 2015 report, in 2013, India and Mexico had the highest numbers of native-born persons living in a foreign country, while Tokelau and San Marino had the lowest.



Definition 
The United Nations defines "foreign-born" as "born in a country other than that in which one resides" to estimate the international migrant stock, whenever this information is available. In countries lacking data on place of birth, the UN uses the country of citizenship instead.

According to the UN: "Equating international migrants with foreign citizens when estimating the migrant stock has important shortcomings. In countries where citizenship is conferred on the basis of jus sanguinis, people who were born in the country of residence may be included in the number of international migrants even though they may have never lived abroad. Conversely, persons who were born abroad and who naturalized in their country of residence are excluded from the stock of international migrants when using citizenship as the criterion to define international migrants."

UN 2019 report: immigrant population

UN 2019 report: emigrant population

See also 
 List of countries ranked by ethnic and cultural diversity level
 List of U.S. states and territories by immigrant population
 List of diasporas

References 

Population
Immigrant population, List of countries by
Immigrant population, List of countries by